Pallacanestro Varese history and statistics in FIBA Europe and Euroleague Basketball (company) competitions.

European competitions

Worldwide competitions

External links
FIBA Europe
Euroleague
ULEB
Eurocup

Varese
EuroLeague-winning clubs